In Greek mythology, Hippocoön (Ancient Greek: Ἱπποκόων) was a Spartan king.

Family 
Hippocoon was the son of the Spartan King Oebalus and Bateia. His brothers (or half-brothers) were Tyndareus and Icarius. Names of Hippocoön's sons include Dorycleus, Scaeus, Enarophorus, Euteiches, Bucolus, Lycaethus, Tebrus, Eurytus, Hippothous, Hippocorystes, Alcinous, Alcimus, Dorceus, Sebrus, Eumedes, Enaesimus, Alcon and Leucippus (the last three were among the Calydonian hunters). Diodorus Siculus states that there were twenty of them, but gives no individual names.

Mythology 
When their father died, Tyndareus became king. Hippocoön, with the help of his sons, overthrew him, took the throne and expelled his brothers from the kingdom . Later, Hippocoön refused to cleanse Heracles after the death of Iphitus. Because of that, Heracles became hostile to Hippocoön, killed him and reinstated Tyndareus. All of Hippocoön's sons were also slain by Heracles, as a revenge for the death of the young Oeonus, son of Licymnius, whom they had killed because he had stoned their dog in self-defense. Heracles's allies in the war against Hippocoön were Cepheus of Arcadia and his twenty sons, who all, as well as Heracles's brother Iphicles, died in the battle (according to Diodorus Siculus, three of Cepheus' sons did survive).

Notes

References 

 Apollodorus, The Library with an English Translation by Sir James George Frazer, F.B.A., F.R.S. in 2 Volumes, Cambridge, MA, Harvard University Press; London, William Heinemann Ltd. 1921. ISBN 0-674-99135-4. Online version at the Perseus Digital Library. Greek text available from the same website.
Diodorus Siculus, The Library of History translated by Charles Henry Oldfather. Twelve volumes. Loeb Classical Library. Cambridge, Massachusetts: Harvard University Press; London: William Heinemann, Ltd. 1989. Vol. 3. Books 4.59–8. Online version at Bill Thayer's Web Site
 Diodorus Siculus, Bibliotheca Historica. Vol 1–2. Immanel Bekker. Ludwig Dindorf. Friedrich Vogel. in aedibus B. G. Teubneri. Leipzig. 1888–1890. Greek text available at the Perseus Digital Library.
 Gaius Julius Hyginus, Fabulae from The Myths of Hyginus translated and edited by Mary Grant. University of Kansas Publications in Humanistic Studies. Online version at the Topos Text Project.
 Pausanias, Description of Greece with an English Translation by W.H.S. Jones, Litt.D., and H.A. Ormerod, M.A., in 4 Volumes. Cambridge, MA, Harvard University Press; London, William Heinemann Ltd. 1918. . Online version at the Perseus Digital Library
Pausanias, Graeciae Descriptio. 3 vols. Leipzig, Teubner. 1903.  Greek text available at the Perseus Digital Library.

Mythological kings of Sparta
Kings in Greek mythology
Laconian characters in Greek mythology